Wakeful was one of the great Thoroughbred mares of the Australian turf. She had shown her versatility by defeating top racehorses at distances from 5½ furlongs to 3 miles. She was unplaced in only three races.

This bay filly was foaled in 1896, and was by the outstanding racehorse and sire, Trenton from Insomnia by Robinson Crusoe. Her pedigree contained mostly good old colonial bloodlines that had proved their worth in Australian racing and breeding. She was offered at the St Aubins stud dispersal sale in 1900 and purchased by Leslie Macdonald for the bargain price of 310 guineas.

Racing record
Wakeful did not commence racing until she was four because of shin soreness. At her third start she won the VATC Oakleigh Plate, followed that by winning the VRC Newmarket Handicap and then the AJC Doncaster Handicap in a race record time of 1:39.75.

Wakeful then went on to win races such as the AJC Plate and VRC Champion Stakes at three miles.

In all she had 44 starts, winning 25 races, was second 12 times and third 4 times.

1902 Racebook

Race starts

Stud record
After finishing racing and going to stud, Wakeful produced ten foals including the 1918 Melbourne Cup winner Night Watch. Some of her other colts were Blairgour (1907) and Baverstock (1911).

Honours
The Wakeful Stakes is a Group 2 race named in her honour, in which 13 fillies have gone on to win the Oaks. In 2002 Wakeful was inducted into the Australian Racing Hall of Fame.

See also
Repeat winners of horse races

References

External links
 Wakeful's Australian Racing Hall of Fame Page

1896 racehorse births
Racehorses bred in Australia
Racehorses trained in Australia
Australian Racing Hall of Fame horses
Thoroughbred family 9-a
Sydney Cup winners